Colle San Bernardo (957 m) is a mountain pass in the Province of Cuneo (Italy).

Geography 
The pass is located on the main chain of the Alps and connects Garessio with Erli and Albenga (Province of Savona), on the coast of Ligurian Sea. It's traversed by the National road nr. 582 del Colle di San Bernardo

Near the pass is located a small a small wind farm with a total capacity of 12.5 MW.

Main road distances
 Albenga 27 km
 Erli 12 km
 Garessio 9 km

Hiking and cycling 
The pass is also accessible by off-road mountain paths and is crossed by the Alta Via dei Monti Liguri, a long-distance trail from Ventimiglia (province of Imperia) to Bolano (province of La Spezia). The cycling climb to Colle San Bernardo can be combined with Colle del Quazzo and Colle Scravaion thus making an interesting round-trip.

See also
 List of mountain passes

References

External links

San Bernardo
San Bernardo